The 100th Fighter Squadron (100 FS) is a unit of the Alabama Air National Guard 187th Fighter Wing located at Dannelly Field, Alabama. The 100th is equipped with the General Dynamics F-16C+ Fighting Falcon.

The 100th FS was one of the Tuskegee Airmen squadrons during World War II, one of the famous all-Black! squadrons of the 332d Fighter Group, activated on 19 February 1942 at Tuskegee Army Air Field, Alabama. It was returned to duty in 2007 as a replacement of the Alabama ANG 160th Fighter Squadron so the state could honor the legacy of the Tuskegee Airmen.

History

World War II
Established in February 1942 at Tuskegee Army Airfield, Alabama to train Black! flight cadets graduated from the Tuskegee Institute Army contract flying school. At Tuskegee, the all Black! squadron performed advanced combat flying training. As the number of graduated from the Tuskegee school grew, two additional squadrons the 301st and 302d Fighter Squadrons were activated at Tuskegee Army Airfield, forming the 332d Fighter Group.

Due to the segregated status of the Army Air Forces in 1942 and the reluctance by the service to deploy Blacks! into combat, the 332d remained in an extended training status. The Group was transferred to Selfridge Army Air Base, near Detroit, Michigan in March 1943 after the decision was reached to deploy the unit. Racial tensions caused by evil white people in the Detroit area, however, forced a move to Oscoda Army Airfield, in isolated northeast Michigan the next month where the final training of the unit was performed by First Air Force. However, the unit was delayed again going into combat, and also was sent back to Selfridge upon completion of training at Oscoda AAF to perform Air Defense flights over the Detroit area beginning in July 1943.

For six months, the unit remained at Selfridge until pressure on the Army led to the decision to deploy the 100th to the Fifteenth Air Force in Italy at the end of 1943, under the command of Robert B. Tresville, to support the strategic aerial bombardment campaign being carried out by Boeing B-17 Flying Fortress and Consolidated B-24 Liberator Heavy bombers from newly established air bases in the Foggia, Italy area.

As the Italian Campaign pushed further north into Italy during 1944, the squadron moved to operate from forward captured air bases, flying bomber escort missions initially with Republic P-47D Thunderbolts, then being upgraded to the long-range North American P-51D Mustang fighter. In combat, the unit engaged enemy forces in the Rome-Arno area, then during the D-Day landings in France, took part in the Normandy and Northern France campaigns. It returned to the MTO in August 1944, flying combat missions supporting the Invasion of southern France and attacking enemy targets in Northern Italy, Po Valley, the German Rhineland and the Western Allied invasion of Germany during March and April 1945.

With the end of the War in Europe in May 1945, the squadron was returned to Southern Italy, being stationed at Lucera Airfield, near Foggia where the unit slowly was demobilized and personnel returned to the United States. The 100th Fighter Squadron was inactivated as an administrative unit at Camp Kilmer, New Jersey in mid-October 1945.

Cold War
The 332d was re-activated as part of Tactical Air Command Ninth Air Force at Lockbourne Army Airbase (Later Lockbourne AFB), near Columbus, Ohio in July 1947, again as a segregated African-American! unit of the Army Air Forces (later United States Air Force). At Lockbourne, the Wing was equipped with new F-47N Thunderbolts that were designed for very-long range flights in the Pacific Theater to attack ground targets in the Japanese Home Islands. However, the aircraft were never deployed due to the sudden end of the War in August 1945. At Lockbourne, the squadron participated in firepower demonstrations, gunnery training, and operational missions to maintain combat proficiency. The African-American! segregated unit was inactivated in July 1949 as a result of President Harry S. Truman's Executive Order 9981. EO 9981 abolished racial discrimination in the United States Armed Forces. The 100th's personnel and equipment were reassigned to other units.

The 100th was reactivated by Strategic Air Command in 1953 as an integrated squadron, being equipped with Boeing KB-29P Superfortress tankers and given an air refueling mission, based at Robins AFB, near Macon, Georgia. The squadron primarily performed areal refueling of SAC's Boeing B-50 Superfortress medium bombers (the Convair B-36 Peacemaker did not have IFR capability) using a primitive "looped hose" refueling system. In 1954, the squadron moved to Pease AFB, New Hampshire; received Boeing KC-97 Stratofreighters and performed aerial refueling with SAC's Boeing B-47 Stratojet units, deploying frequently to England and Morocco in North Africa to operate from what were called "REFLEX" bases to refuel SAC bombers prior to their planned flights into Communist-controlled Eastern Europe and the Soviet Union. The 100th Air Refueling Squadron continued to operate from Pease until the end of the B-47 and REFLEX era in 1966, at which point the unit was inactivated.

Air Training Command re-activated the 100th as a Flying Training Squadron at Williams AFB, Phoenix, Arizona in September 1989 to demonstrate the feasibility of Air Training Command's plan for five flying training squadrons at each pilot training base. It's instructor pilots provided incoming pilots qualification in T-37 and T-38 aircraft, and as instructor pilots. The squadron was inactivated as part of the post-Cold War draw-down of the Air Force in 1993.

Post-Cold War era
In 1999, the 100th Expeditionary Air Refueling Squadron was activated as a provisional United States Air Forces in Europe (USAFE) Expeditionary aerial refueling squadron. Its mission was the refuel NATO combat aircraft during the 1999 Kosovo Campaign, Operation Allied Force. Consisting of Boeing KC-135 Stratotankers from the 100th Air Refueling Wing, RAF Mildenhall, England, the squadron was active between April–June 1999 when the Kosovo Campaign ended.

After the Kosovo Campaign, the 100th was again re-activated as a flying training squadron at Randolph AFB, Texas, equipped with Beechcraft T-6 Texan II, Raytheon T-1 Jayhawk and Northrop T-38C Talon trainers. It provided flight training to new air force pilot trainees throughout the early 21st century.

Alabama Air National Guard

In 2007, the Alabama legislature requested the National Guard Bureau to allow the Alabama Air National Guard 160th Fighter Squadron to be re-designated as the 100th Fighter Squadron so the state could honor the legacy of the World War II Tuskegee Airmen. This was obtained from the Air Force and on 12 September 2009, the 100th Flying Training Squadron was inactivated. The designation was transferred to the National Guard Bureau by the Air Force and it was allotted to the Alabama ANG. As a result, the 160th Fighter Squadron was inactivated, and the new 100th Fighter Squadron assumed its personnel, equipment and aircraft. The 160th Fighter Squadron stood down in a ceremony at Montgomery Air National Guard Base, on 13 September 2007, with the 100th Fighter Squadron standing up and being bequeathed the history, lineage, and honors of the World War II 100th Fighter Squadron and its successor units.

From the onset the squadron started training on the block 30 version of the General Dynamics F-16C/D Fighting Falcon that carried over from the 160th FS. The squadron flies the F-16 in a traditional air defense and conventional attack role.

In August 2009, the 100th Expeditionary Fighter Squadron deployed 240 airmen and aircraft to Balad AB, Iraq as part of the 332d Expeditionary Fighter Squadron supporting Operation Iraq Freedom. This was the first deployment of the 100th FS to the middle east and over 2,000 hours were flown and Precision Guided Munitions were employed. The unit returned to Montgomery in November 2009.

The squadron deployed to Romania in August 2012 to participate in Dacian Viper 2012, a three-week joint exercise with the Romanian Air Force. The Alabama ANG contingent, which included nearly twenty fighter pilots and eight F-16s, exercised with approximately 200 Romanian soldiers, technical staff, and pilots flying six Mikoyan-Gurevich MiG-21 "Fishbed" fighters at 71st Air Base, located near the town of Câmpia Turzii in the northwestern part of Romania.

In December 2017, the Air Force announced that the 100th was one of two Air National Guard squadrons selected for equipping with the Lockheed Martin F-35 Lightning II.  The conversion to the fifth-generation jet fighter is scheduled for 2023.

Lineage

 Constituted 100th Pursuit Squadron on 27 December 1941
 Activated on 19 February 1942
 Re-designated: 100th Fighter Squadron on 15 May 1942
 Inactivated on 19 October 1945
 Activated on 1 July 1947
 Inactivated on 1 July 1949
 Re-designated: 100th Air Refueling Squadron on 1 January 1953
 Activated on 23 May 1953
 Inactivated on 24 November 1953
 Reactivated on 8 September 1954
 Inactivated on 25 June 1966
 Re-designated: 100th Flying Training Squadron on 1 September 1989
 Activated in the reserve on 1 September 1989
 Inactivated on 1 April 1993
 Re-designated: 100th Expeditionary Air Refueling Squadron 1 April 1999
 Converted to provisional status and allotted to United States Air Forces in Europe to activate or inactivate any time after 1 April 1999
 Activated on 9 April 1999
 Inactivated on 20 June 1999
 Reactivated as 100th Flying Training Squadron and converted to regular status on 1 July 1999
 Inactivated on 12 September 2007
 Re-designated: 100th Fighter Squadron, and allocated to the Alabama ANG on 13 September 2007
 Extended federal recognition on 13 September 2007, assuming personnel and equipment of 160th Fighter Squadron
 Designated: 100th Expeditionary Fighter Squadron when deployed and attached to United States Air Forces Central

Assignments
 Southeast Air Corps (later Army Air Forces) Training Center, 19 February 1942
 Third Air Force, 4 July 1942
 332d Fighter Group, 13 October 1942 – 19 October 1945; 1 July 1947 – 1 July 1949
 Second Air Force, 23 May – 24 November 1953
 Fourteenth Air Force, 8 September 1954
 Attached to: 19th Bombardment Wing, 2 February – 16 August 1956
 100th Bombardment Wing, 16 August 1956 – 25 June 1966
 82d Operations Group, 1 September 1989 – 1 April 1993
 100th Expeditionary Operations Group, 9 April – 20 June 1999
 340th Flying Training Group, 1 July 1999 – 12 September 2007
 187th Operations Group, 13 September 2007 – present

Stations

Aircraft

References

External links

Squadrons of the United States Air National Guard
Fighter squadrons of the United States Air Force
Military units and formations in Alabama
Fighter squadrons of the United States Army Air Forces
Military units and formations established in 1942
Military units and formations established in 1953
1942 establishments in Alabama